Damion Marquez Williams James (born October 7, 1987) is an American former professional basketball player who last played for Vaqueros de Bayamón of the Baloncesto Superior Nacional (BSN). He played college basketball for Texas.

High school career
Considered a five-star recruit by Rivals.com, James was listed as the No. 7 small forward and the No. 17 player in the nation in 2006. He initially signed to play college basketball at the University of Oklahoma for head coach Kelvin Sampson. When Sampson took the head coaching position at Indiana University, the administration at Oklahoma released James from his letter of intent and he switched his decision to Texas.

College career

Freshman season
James started all 35 games, along with fellow freshmen Kevin Durant and D. J. Augustin, in leading the Longhorns to a 25–10 record. James averaged 25.9 minutes per contest, with 7.6 points and 7.2 rebounds.

Sophomore season
James averaged 13.2 points and 10.3 rebounds, helping Texas win a share of the Big 12 regular season title. While talking about the Texas Longhorns on Selection Sunday, Dick Vitale said that James may be the most athletic player in all of college basketball. He also shot 43.6% from behind the arc.

Junior season
James, along with A. J. Abrams and Justin Mason, started all 35 games for the Texas Longhorns that went 23–12 and advanced to the second round of the 2009 NCAA Men's Division I Basketball Tournament. He averaged 15.4 points and 9.2 rebounds with double doubles in 16 of the games on his way to earning a spot on the All-Big 12 Conference Second Team. On April 15, 2009, James entered his name into the 2009 NBA draft, without hiring an agent, and thus retaining his NCAA eligibility. On June 13, 2009, it was reported that James pulled his name from the draft after not being guaranteed a first-round draft position.

Senior season
As a senior, James averaged 18.0 points, 10.3 rebounds, and one assist per game.

Professional career
James was selected by the Atlanta Hawks with the 24th overall pick in the 2010 NBA draft. His rights were later traded to the New Jersey Nets for the rights of the 27th pick Jordan Crawford and 31st pick Tibor Pleiß. On July 15, 2010, he signed a multi-year deal with the Nets and subsequently joined them for the 2010 NBA Summer League. On December 9, 2010, James got his first career start against the Dallas Mavericks.

In January 2012, it was announced that James would miss the rest of the 2011–12 NBA season after undergoing surgery to replace the screw that had been inserted in the broken right foot he suffered the previous season.
 
On September 12, 2012, he signed with the Atlanta Hawks. However, he was later waived by the Hawks on October 27, 2012.

On November 1, 2012, James was acquired by the Bakersfield Jam of the NBA D-League.

On January 13, 2013, he signed a 10-day with the Brooklyn Nets. On January 23, 2013, he returned to the Jam.

On February 4, 2013, James was named to the Prospects All-Star roster for the 2013 NBA D-League All-Star Game.

In July 2013, James joined the Brooklyn Nets for the Orlando Summer League and the Miami Heat for the Las Vegas Summer League. On September 30, 2013, James signed with the Denver Nuggets. However, he was later waived by the Nuggets on October 26, 2013.

On December 5, 2013, James was reacquired by the Bakersfield Jam. On February 20, 2014, he was traded to the Texas Legends. On April 3, 2014, he signed a 10-day contract with the San Antonio Spurs. On April 13, 2014, he signed with the Spurs for the rest of the season. On June 15, 2014, he won his first NBA championship after the Spurs defeated the Miami Heat 4 games to 1 in the 2014 NBA Finals.

In July 2014, James joined the Detroit Pistons for the 2014 NBA Summer League. On September 29, 2014, he signed with the Washington Wizards. However, he was later waived by the Wizards on October 25, 2014. On November 3, 2014, he was reacquired by the Texas Legends. On February 17, 2015, he terminated his contract with the Legends. The next day, he signed with the Alaska Aces as an import for the 2015 PBA Commissioner's Cup.

On August 4, 2015, James signed a one-year deal with Le Mans Sarthe Basket of the LNB Pro A. On November 20, 2015, he parted ways with Le Mans after appearing in six league games and five Eurocup games. On December 9, 2015, he signed with the Sydney Kings as an injury replacement for Josh Childress. He was released on December 29 following the return of Childress. James' tenure with the Kings was considered sub-par, as he helped the team win just one game and from the field, he shot a mere 22%. His 11 baskets from 49 shots and below-par defence reflected how much he struggled in his five-game NBL stint. In five games for the Kings, James averaged 7.0 points and 7.8 rebounds per game. On January 26, 2016, he signed with the Cangrejeros de Santurce of Puerto Rico for the 2016 BSN season.

In August 2016, James signed with Guaros de Lara.

On November 4, 2017, James signed with the Israeli team Hapoel Eilat for the 2017–18 season, joining his former teammate Mike Rosario. However, on December 13, 2017, he was released by Eilat after appearing in four games. On December 31, he signed with Capitanes de Arecibo of Puerto Rico.

On May 17, 2018, James signed with Vaqueros de Bayamón of Puerto Rico after a two-game stint with Cariduros de Fajardo.

NBA career statistics

Regular season

|-
| style="text-align:left;|
| style="text-align:left;|New Jersey
| 25 || 9 || 16.1 || .447 || .000 || .643 || 3.4 || .8 || .6 || .5 || 4.4
|-
| style="text-align:left;|
| style="text-align:left;|New Jersey
| 7 || 7 || 24.3 || .371 || .000 || .667 || 4.7 || .4 || 1.0 || 1.0 || 4.9
|-
| style="text-align:left;|
| style="text-align:left;|Brooklyn
| 2 || 0 || .0 ||  ||  ||  || .5 || .0 || .0 || .0 || .0
|-
| style="text-align:left; background:#afe6ba;"|†
| style="text-align:left;|San Antonio
| 5 || 1 || 10.0 || .222 || .000 || 1.000 || 2.4 || .6 || .0 || .2 || 1.2
|- class="sortbottom"
| style="text-align:center;" colspan="2"|Career
| 39 || 17 || 16.0 || .415 || .000 || .667 || 3.4 || .7 || .6 || .5 || 3.8

See also

 2006 high school boys basketball All-Americans
 2010 NCAA Men's Basketball All-Americans

References

External links

FIBA.com profile

1987 births
Living people
Alaska Aces (PBA) players
All-American college men's basketball players
American expatriate basketball people in Australia
American expatriate basketball people in France
American expatriate basketball people in Israel
American expatriate basketball people in the Philippines
American expatriate basketball people in Venezuela
American men's basketball players
Atlanta Hawks draft picks
Bakersfield Jam players
Basketball players from New Mexico
Basketball players from Texas
Brooklyn Nets players
Cangrejeros de Santurce basketball players
Capitanes de Arecibo players
Guaros de Lara (basketball) players
Hapoel Eilat basketball players
Le Mans Sarthe Basket players
New Jersey Nets players
Parade High School All-Americans (boys' basketball)
People from Hobbs, New Mexico
People from Nacogdoches, Texas
Philippine Basketball Association imports
San Antonio Spurs players
Small forwards
Sydney Kings players
Texas Legends players
Texas Longhorns men's basketball players